Anatoliy Pakhtusov (born 17 April 1985 in Mirnoye) is a Ukrainian former professional cyclist, who rode professionally between 2009 and 2016, entirely for the  team.

Major results

2006
 8th Memorial Oleg Dyachenko
2007
 9th Gran Premio Industrie del Marmo
2008
 3rd Overall Giro della Valle d'Aosta
1st Stage 1
 6th Trofeo Città di Castelfidardo
 9th Piccolo Giro di Lombardia
2009
 5th Coupe des Carpathes
 7th Tartu GP
 8th Memorial Oleg Dyachenko
 9th Grand Prix of Donetsk
2011
 2nd Road race, National Road Championships
 2nd Overall An Post Rás
 4th Mayor Cup
 6th Memorial Oleg Dyachenko
 8th Overall Tour of Szeklerland
2012
 2nd Overall Tour of Szeklerland
1st Stage 2
 2nd Puchar Ministra Obrony Narodowej
 3rd Overall Grand Prix of Sochi
1st Stage 1
 4th Memorial Oleg Dyachenko
 9th Race Horizon Park
2013
 1st Grand Prix of Donetsk
 5th Race Horizon Park 2
 6th Overall Grand Prix of Sochi
 6th Overall Baltic Chain Tour
 7th Overall Tour d'Azerbaïdjan
 7th Race Horizon Park 1
 8th Central European Tour Miskolc GP
 10th Overall Sibiu Cycling Tour
2014
 6th Overall Five Rings of Moscow
 7th Memorial Oleg Dyachenko
 7th Memoriał Henryka Łasaka
 9th Overall Course de la Solidarité Olympique
 9th Race Horizon Park 3
 10th Race Horizon Park 2
2015
 2nd Grand Prix of Vinnytsia
 3rd Horizon Park Race for Peace
 4th Overall Okolo Slovenska
 7th Horizon Park Classic

References

External links

1985 births
Living people
Ukrainian male cyclists